Niall Carolan (born 18 April 2002) is an Irish Gaelic footballer who plays for Cuchulainns and the Cavan county team.

Playing career

Club
Carolan joined the Cuchulainns at a young age and joined the club's senior team in 2020.

Inter-county

Minor and under-20
Carolan was captain of the Cavan under-20 team for the 2022 season. On 22 April, Carolan was in the half-back line as Cavan faced Tyrone in the Ulster final. Tyrone came out winners on a 0-11 to 0-10 scoreline.

Senior
Carolan joined the Cavan senior squad in 2022 after the Ulster under-20 final loss. On 28 May, Carolan made his senior debut in a first round Tailteann Cup win over Down, scoring a point as a second half substitute. Carolan made his first senior start in the quarter-final win over Fermanagh on 5 June. Cavan went on to face Westmeath in the final on 9 July. Carolan started the game, with Westmeath coming out winners by four points.

References

2002 births
Living people
Niall
Cavan inter-county Gaelic footballers